Vilnius College of Technologies and Design or VTDK is a Lithuanian state institution of higher education

VTDK  is one of the largest universities of applied sciences in Lithuania, with approximately 2,000 students and 200 professors

History 
The college was established in 1954.  In 2008, the Vilnius Technical College merged with the Vilnius College of Construction and Design, creating VTDK.

Overview 
VTDK consists of three faculties: the Civil Engineering Faculty, the Technical Faculty and the Design Faculty. The college offers 15 full-time study programs, partial studies through exchange programs, as well as informal study courses and training.

VTDK maintains close cooperation with many Lithuanian and foreign partners, takes part in various international projects, and is a member of the Universities of Applied Sciences network (UASnet) and the European Association of Institutions in Higher Education (EURASCHE).

Study programs 
VTDK  offers 15 full-time study programs, partial studies through exchange programs, as well as informal study courses and training. Program duration is 3 years (6 semesters) and students receive a professional bachelor's degree upon graduation.

Civil Engineering Faculty

 Engineering Systems of Buildings
 Geodesy and Cadastre
 Transport Logistics
 Civil Engineering

Technical Faculty

 Technical Maintenance of Automobiles
 Electrical and Automation Engineering
 Mechanical Technologies Engineering
 Railway Transport Engineering
 Transport Information Systems
 Renewable Energy
 Car Electronics

Design Faculty

 Technology of Photography
 Multimedia Design
 Graphic Design
 Interior Design

Facilities
VTDK  has the following facilities:
  50 laboratories
  9 libraries
  5 drawing rooms
 The TOYOTA technical training center
  The language learning center
  The distance learning center
  Sport facilities
  Dormitories

External links 
 

Universities and colleges in Vilnius
Engineering universities and colleges
Technical universities and colleges in Lithuania